List of the bishops of Eichstätt.

Bishops of Eichstätt, 741-1790
Willibald 741-786
Geroch 786-801
Aganus 801-819
Adalung 820-841
Altun 841-858
Ottokar 858-881
Gottschalk 881-884
Erkenbald 884-916
Udalfried 916-933
Starchand 933-966
Reginold 966-989
Megingoz von Lechsgemund 989-1014
Gundackar I 1014-1019
Walter 1020-1021
Heribert von Rothenburg 1022-1042
Guzmann von Rothenburg 1042
Gebhard of Calw 1042-1057
Gundackar II 1057-1075
Ulrich I 1075-1099
Eberhard I von Vohburg-Schweinfurt 1100-1112
Ulrich II von Bogen 1112-1125
Gebhard II von Hirschberg 1125-1149
Burkhard von Memlem 1149-1153
Konrad I von Morsberg 1153-1171
Egilolf 1171-1182
Otto 1182-1195
Hartwich I von Hirschberg 1195-1223
Friedrich I von Hauenstadt 1223-1225
Heinrich I von Ziplingen 1225-1229
Heinrich II von Tischlingen 1229-1234
Heinrich III von Ravensberg 1234-1237
Friedrich II von Parsberg 1237-1246
Heinrich IV von Württemberg 1246-1259
Engelhard 1259-1261
Hildebrand von Morn 1261-1279
Reimbrecht von Mulenhard 1279-1297
Konrad II von Pfaffenhausen 1297-1305
Johann I von Durbheim 1305-1306
Philipp von Rathsamhausen 1306-1322
Marquard I von Hageln 1322-1324
Gebhard III von Graisbacch 1324-1327
Friedrich III von Leuchtenberg 1328-1329
Friedrich IV von Nürnburg 1328-1329
Heinrich V Schenk von Reicheneck 1329-1344
Albrecht I von Hohenfels 1344-1353
Berthold von Nürnburg 1355-1365
Rhabanus Schenk von Wildburgstetten 1365-1383
Friedrich V von Öttingen 1383-1415
Johann II von Heideck 1415-1429
Albrecht II von Rechberg 1429-1445
Johann III von Eich 1445-1464
Wilhelm von Reichenau 1464-1496
Gabriel von Eyb 1496-1535
Christoph von Pappenheim-Stahlingen 1535-1539
Moritz von Hutten 1539-1552
Eberhard II von Hirnheim 1552-1560
Martin von Schaumburg 1560-1590
Kaspar von Seckendorf 1590-1595
Johann Konrad von Gemmingen 1595-1612
Johann Christoph von Westerstetten 1612-1636
Marquard II Schenk von Castell 1637-1685
Johann Eucharius Schenk von Castell 1685-1697
Johann Martin von Eyb 1697-1704
Johann Anton I Knebel von Katznellenbogen 1705-1725
Ludwig Franz Schenk von Castell 1725-1736
Johann Anton II von Freinerg-Hopferau 1736-1757
Raimondo Antonio di Strasoldo 1757-1781
Johann Anton III von Zehmen 1781-1790

Bishops of Eichstätt, 1790 - present